Charles Hare was an Anglican priest in Ireland in the 19th Century.

Peacocke was born in Cashel, and educated at Portora Royal School and Trinity College, Dublin. He was  Archdeacon of Limerick from 1871 until 1881.

References

Archdeacons of Limerick
People educated at Portora Royal School
Alumni of Trinity College Dublin
19th-century Irish Anglican priests
Church of Ireland priests
People from Cashel, County Tipperary